Edward, Ed or Eddie Robertson may refer to:

Public officials
Edward White Robertson (1823–1887), United States Representative from Louisiana
Edward V. Robertson (1881–1963), United States Senator from Wyoming
Edward Albert Robertson (1929–1991), Australian politician; best known as Ted Robertson
Edward D. Robertson Jr. (born 1952), chief justice of Missouri Supreme Court

Others
Edward Robertson (Semitic scholar) (1879–1964), Scottish academic
Eddie Robertson (1935–1981), Scottish footballer
Ed Robertson (born 1970), Canadian lead singer of Barenaked Ladies
Edward C. Robertson (died 1903), American football player and coach

See also
Edward Roberts (disambiguation)